Connect is a Scottish drama film directed by Marilyn Edmond and starring Kevin Guthrie, Siobhan Reilly and Stephen McCole. The film follows the central character of Brian, living in a small town in Scotland, he must overcome his depression and the voice that haunts him daily.

Main cast 

 Kevin Guthrie as Brian
 Siobhan Reilly as Sam
 Stephen McCole as Jeff
 Sara Vickers as Debbie
Cameron Fulton as Gavin

Release and reception 
Connect is director, Marilyn Edmond's debut film. It premiered at the 2019 Glasgow Film Festival  It was also selected to play at The Orlando Film Festival, Film Focus Festival and The Sydney Indie Film Festival where it picked up several nominations (Best Film, Best Drama Film, Best Male lead & Best Female Lead)  and saw Marilyn Edmond win Best Director.

The film had a successful local cinema run throughout Scotland with screenings at the Dundee Contemporary Arts Centre, The GFT, Grosvenor Cinema, The Scotsman Picturehouse and more.

Eddie Harrison of  Film Authority rated the film with 4 stars stating, “Connect is a simple and effective drama that shines a light on a subject that most films avoid or exploit; hopefully it'll gain a following by offering a fresh take on a universally mis-understood subject that needs tackled today.”

Reviews on The Guardian website were much less favourable.

The film also received positive publicity from publications eager to shine a light on the movies theme of male suicide from newspapers such as The Times.

Kevin Guthrie was interviewed specifically by The National on taking a break from Hollywood movies like Fantastic Beasts and Where To find Them to return to Scotland and film Connect

Marilyn Edmond's debut saw her catapulted onto Bafta's radar where she took part in a career Close-up Q&A Session

Awards

References

External links 

 
 Central City Media - Distributor

Scottish films
Films set in Scotland
Films shot in Scotland
English-language Scottish films
British independent films
2019 films
2019 comedy films
2019 directorial debut films
2010s English-language films
2010s British films